Garlando is a company based in Italy that produces pocket billiards (pool), table football (foosball) and ping pong tables.

History

Garlando was founded officially in 1954 at Spinetta Marengo – a small village near Alessandria – by Renato Garlando, the father of the present managing director, already in the market for the production of various wood objects. An activity that he, in his turn, had inherited from his father.

Following the success of table football, originating in the United Kingdom in the early 1920s, and later the United States, Spain and France, Renato Garlando decided to produce them for the Italian market, where he had unexpected success.

From then on, the company continuously grew. Foreign countries were added to the domestic revenue, including overseas to the United States, where the Garlando football tables experienced a boom in the 1970s.

During this time, Garlando began manufacturing pool tables with the same domestic success as with table football equipment.

In the course of the 1980s, the current managing director, Giuseppe Garlando, took the lead and, with his brother Marino, began renovating the working procedures which, from still largely craftsmanlike, became industrialised and standardised.

In the same period the factory dimensions enlarged, the number of the employees increased, while they become more and more skilled, new computerised machinery is purchased to reach the utmost precision in the output, new foreign markets are open on which Garlando soon becomes a leader.

In the 1990s, the North Africa and Eastern Europe markets were tapped, and the product range was expanded to meet the requirements of new segments of public.

To meet more and more urgent production requirements, late in 2002 the company left Spinetta Marengo to move to their much more modern premises at Pozzolo Formigaro, near Novi Ligure, a dozen kilometres from the old site.

The company now covers a 10,000 square metre area, equipped with the most modern machines to work the wood as well as to mould the plastic. The new location employs over 60 people, both for the office and the factory.

References

External links
Official Website
ITSF World Cup 2006 played on Garlando Tables
Garlando Tables in Germany
 Garlando Foosball Table Reviews Garlando Foosball Table Reviews
 Garlando Foosball Table in Russia Garlando Foosball Table 

Manufacturing companies established in 1954
Sporting goods manufacturers of Italy
Novi Ligure
Cue sports equipment manufacturers
Table football
Italian brands
Italian companies established in 1954
Companies based in Piedmont